This is the complete list of Olympic medalists in diving.

Current program

Men

10 metre platform

Medal table

3 metre springboard

Medal table

Synchronized 10 metre platform

Medal table

Synchronized 3 metre springboard

Medal table

Women

10 metre platform

Medal table

3 metre springboard

Medal table

Synchronized 10 metre platform

Medal table

Synchronized 3 metre springboard

Medal table

Discontinued events

Men

Plain high diving

Medal table

Plunge for distance

Medal table

All-time medal table 1904–2020

See also
 Diving at the 1906 Intercalated Games — these Intercalated Games are no longer regarded as official Games by the International Olympic Committee

References
 International Olympic Committee results database

Diving
medalists

Olympic